John Duthie may refer to:
 John Duthie (footballer, born 1903), Scottish professional footballer
 John Duthie (footballer, born 1951) Australian rules footballer
 John Duthie (poker player) (born 1958), English television director and creator of the European Poker Tour
 John Duthie (politician) (1841–1915), politician and businessman in New Zealand
 John Firminger Duthie (1845–1922), English botanist and explorer
 Sir John Duthie (barrister) (1858–1922), prominent Scottish barrister knighted in 1918